Pedro Affonso Collor de Melo (14 December 1952 – 19 December 1994) was the brother of former Brazilian president Fernando Collor. Working for the Collor family's newspaper Gazeta de Alagoas, Pedro Collor gained prominence when he made a series of accusations against his brother, who was then president. The allegations include corruption, and drug use.  Pedro Collor's revelations helped precipitate his brother's downfall in 1992.  Pedro Collor died of brain cancer in 1994.

References
 Veja >Interview in Portuguese to Veja magazine.
  >Interview in Portuguese, to Brazilian TV.

1952 births
1994 deaths
20th-century Brazilian businesspeople
People from Maceió
Brazilian whistleblowers